St Mary's Church, Marston on Dove is a Grade I listed parish church in the Church of England in Marston on Dove, Derbyshire.

History

The church dates from the 13th century. It is built of sandstone ashlar with Welsh slate roofs with stone coped gables. It comprises a west tower and spire, aisled nave with south porch and chancel. It was restored between 1927 and 1929 under the supervision of Derby architect Percy Heylin Curry.

Bells
The church contains the oldest bell in Derbyshire, which was cast in 1366 by John of Stafford.

Organ
The pipe organ dates from the late 17th century and was originally in Sudbury Hall, Derbyshire, and later in Sudbury parish church. A specification of the organ can be found on the National Pipe Organ Register.

See also
Grade I listed churches in Derbyshire
Grade I listed buildings in Derbyshire
Listed buildings in Marston on Dove

References

Church of England church buildings in Derbyshire
Grade I listed churches in Derbyshire